Finley may refer to:

Finley (name), a given name and surname
Finley (band), Italian pop/punk band
 Finley, a brand of The Coca-Cola Company

Places 
United States
Finley, California
Finley, Indiana, also known as Carrollton
Finley, Kentucky
Finley, North Dakota
Finley, Oklahoma
Finley, Tennessee
Finley, Washington
Finley, Wisconsin, a town
Finley (community), Wisconsin, an unincorporated community
Finley Golf Course, Chapel Hill, North Carolina
Finley Hospital, Dubuque, Iowa
Finley Point, Montana
Finley Township, Scott County, Indiana
East Finley Township, Pennsylvania
West Finley Township, Pennsylvania

Australia
Finley, New South Wales

See also 
 Findlay (disambiguation)
 Finlay